Natalya Nykolayivna Yakovenko (born 16 October 1942) is a Ukrainian historian (Doctor of Historical Sciences), specialist in Latin language, and professor of the National University of Kyiv-Mohyla Academy.

Biography 
Historian, Doctor of Historical Sciences (1994), Professor. Graduated from the Classics Department of the Faculty of Foreign Languages at Lviv University (1967). In 1970-1981 she worked as a senior researcher at the Central State Historical Archive of Ukraine, in 1981-1987 she was a lecturer at Kyiv University, in 1987-1991 she was a senior researcher at the Institute of History of Ukraine of the National Academy of Sciences of Ukraine, in 1991-1995 she was the head of the department of the Institute of Ukrainian Archeography and Source Studies of the National Academy of Sciences of Ukraine, since 1995 she has been a leading researcher of the National Academy of Sciences of Ukraine, and since 1992 she has been a professor at the Kyiv-Mohyla Academy and the head of the Department of History at the National University of Kyiv-Mohyla Academy. At the Institute of History of the National Academy of Sciences of Ukraine, she defended her dissertation on Latin paleography (on documents originating in Ukraine). Subsequently, she began working as a professional historian, starting with the history of the Ukrainian gentry.

Bibliography
 Myronova, V., Yakvenko, N. Textbook of Latin language.
 Yakovenko, N. Ukrainian nobility from the end of 14th century to the mid of 17th century. Ed.1. Naukova dumka. Kiev 1993.
 Yakovenko, N. Ukrainian nobility from the end of 14th century to the mid of 17th century. Ed.2. Krytyka. Kiev 2008. .
 Yakovenko, N. Outline of history of Ukraine from Ancient times to the end of 18th century. Ed.1. Heneza. Kiev 1997. .
 Yakovenko, N. Outline of history of Ukraine from Ancient times to the end of 18th century. Ed.2. Krytyka. Kiev 2005. .
 Yakovenko, N. Outline of history of Ukraine from Ancient times to the end of 18th century. Ed.3. Krytyka. Kiev 2006. .
 Yakovenko, N. Parallel world. Research on history of representations and ideas in Ukraine in the 16th-17th centuries. Krytyka. Kiev 2002. .
 Yakovenko, N. Introduction to History. Krytyka. Kiev 2007. .
 Yakovenko, N. Mirror of identity. Research on history of representations and ideas in Ukraine in the 17th century - beginning of 18th centuries. Laurus. Kiev 2012. .

See also
 Handbook on history of Ukraine

External links

Personal interview 

 Klochko, D. In order to move forward it is necessary to talk the language of the end of 20th century. Newspaper Den. 21 January 2000
 Desyatyryk, D. Great illusion. Newspaper Den. 2 August 2002
 Chornei, Yu. For historian it is not given to realize the world as it used to be. Mirror Weekly. 25 January 2003
 Makhun, S. A historian is a slave of source. Mirror Weekly. 16 October 2004
 Makhun, S. ...To find real normal person that lost in history. Mirror Weekly. 3 December 2005

Others about N.Yakovenko 
 Desyatyryk, D. A wonderful parallel world. Newspaper Den. (recension on the work "Parallel world. Research on history of representations and ideas in Ukraine in 16th – 17th centuries")
 Hudzyk, K. Parallel world. Newspaper Den. (recension on the work "Parallel world. Research on history of representations and ideas in Ukraine in 16th – 17th centuries")
 Yakovenko's profile at the National University of Kyiv-Mohyla Academy website
 Nahorna, T. Freedon lecture. Without quotations. Zbruč. 29 May 2013
 Marynovych, M. Presentation of Natalia Yakvenko. Zbruč. 31 May 2013
 Hrytsak, Ya. Word of gratitude to Natalia Yakovenko. Zbruč 30 May 2013

Living people
1942 births
People from Kirovohrad Oblast
People from Reichskommissariat Ukraine
University of Lviv alumni
21st-century Ukrainian historians
Historians of Ukraine
Institute of Ukrainian Archaeography and Source Studies people
Institute of History of Ukraine alumni
Academic staff of the National University of Kyiv-Mohyla Academy
Recipients of the Cross of Ivan Mazepa
Ukrainian women historians
20th-century Ukrainian historians